"We Were" is a song written by Eric Church, Ryan Tyndell, and Jeff Hyde and recorded by Australian country music artist Keith Urban. It was released on 13 May 2019 as the first single from Urban's eleventh studio album The Speed of Now Part 1 (2020). A duet version featuring Church was later released, making it the second collaboration between Urban and Church, following 2015's "Raise 'Em Up". The song reached number-one on the Canada Country chart.

Background
Country music singer Eric Church wrote the song with Ryan Tyndell and Jeff Hyde, and Urban produced it with longtime producer Dann Huff. The song uses "vivid imagery" and "earnest nostalgia" to tell of "romances that we all know won't last". Billy Dukes of the blog Taste of Country found the song similar in content and tone to previous Urban singles such as "'Til Summer Comes Around" and "We Were Us", while also noting a more "sparse" production compared to the Graffiti U album preceding it. On 2 August 2019, Urban released an acoustic remix. The song was released as a limited-edition 7-inch vinyl with a cover of Marshmello and Bastille's "Happier" as its B-side.

Chart performance
"We Were" reached number four on Billboard's Country Airplay chart. It has sold 65,000 copies in the United States as of November 2019.

Charts

Weekly charts

Year-end charts

Certifications

References

2019 songs
2019 singles
Keith Urban songs
Eric Church songs
Capitol Records Nashville singles
Male vocal duets
Songs written by Eric Church
Songs written by Jeff Hyde
Songs written by Ryan Tyndell
Song recordings produced by Dann Huff